John Kilpatrick was the chairman of the Oklahoma Turnpike Authority in the early 1990s. The John Kilpatrick Turnpike in Oklahoma City was named after him.

References

Heads of Oklahoma state agencies
Living people
Year of birth missing (living people)